Petar Juzvisen Kostadinović (born 29 October 1992) is a Croatian footballer who plays for AC Trento.

Biography
Born in Rijeka, Croatia, Kostadinović was signed by Lecce on a free transfer on 7 September 2010, from Juventus. In the next season he was signed by Serie D (Italian fifth division until 2014) club Ancona. He played 27 times in the amateur league.

Nocerina 
On 26 July 2012 the third division club Nocerina signed him. He was an unused bench in 2012–13 Italian Cup. On 31 August he was signed by fellow third division club Prato. On 31 January 2013 Kostadinović left for Sorrento, with Alessandro Cesarini and Alessandro Di Dio moved to opposite direction.

On 1 July 2013 Kostadinović returned to Nocera Inferiore. However the club was expelled from the league due to sports fraud in the derby against Salernitana. The match on 10 November 2013 Nocerina had 3 players "injured" in the first minute followed by Remedi, Hottor, Danti, Kostadinović and Lepore. The first 3 "injured" players were acquitted but the latter 5 were suspended from football for 1 year. The ban later reduced to 8 months.

On 1 August 2014 Nocerina was assigned to Eccellenza, two divisions below Lega Pro, now as a one unified division.

Vigor Lamezia
On 9 July 2014 he was signed by Vigor Lamezia. Due to the ban, Kostadinović made his competitive club debut in October.

References

External links
 
 AIC profile (data by football.it) 
 

1992 births
Living people
Footballers from Rijeka
Association football fullbacks
Croatian footballers
A.C. Ancona players
A.S.G. Nocerina players
A.C. Prato players
Vigor Lamezia players
Serie C players
Croatian expatriate footballers
Expatriate footballers in Italy
Croatian expatriate sportspeople in Italy